Barnes Branch is an unincorporated community in Madison County, North Carolina, United States. The area was inhabited by the Cherokee tribe for thousands of years prior to  the arrival of settlers in the early 18th century. Arrowheads and numerous artifacts have been found while farmers plowed the bottoms for tobacco.

Several old tobacco barns still exist in the cove to date, most being repurposed as farming barns.

Unincorporated communities in Madison County, North Carolina
Unincorporated communities in North Carolina